Jane Wells (born March 31, 1961) is a CNBC special correspondent, based in Los Angeles, where she covers stories about funny business, strange successes and other special assignments.

Wells writes offbeat stories for CNBC.com and serves as a contributor for radio stations. One recent story was about a 34-year-old Portland woman who got paid for cuddling people and a college student who invented a special beer shelf that made him a millionaire. She has worked for CNBC for more than 20 years, including earlier stints covering retail, agriculture and defense as well as news about the California economy, West Coast real estate and Las Vegas trends. Wells came from CNBC's "Upfront Tonight" where she was senior correspondent.

Career
Wells was a correspondent for the Fox News Channel and Los Angeles reporter for NBC's flagship television station, WNBC, New York City. She then joined CNBC in 1996, where she provided special coverage of the O. J. Simpson civil case for "Rivera Live" starring Geraldo Rivera. Her career includes reporter positions with KTTV, Los Angeles; WTVJ, Miami; and, KOB, Albuquerque. She has also taken part in several international reports for CNN.

Wells started as a news writer for KTLA in Los Angeles.

In 1989, while working for KTTV she ventured into the infamous Watts' Imperial Courts housing project to uncover the story of gangs threatening local residents. She and her cameraman narrowly escaped after they were threatened by a gun-toting gang member. The experience was broadcast to give others a sense of the daily struggles of residents living in inner-city public housing projects.

Wells once said her most fascinating assignment was covering the death of Mother Teresa. After the Roman Catholic nun's death, she recalls visiting a leper colony in India.

Wells is perhaps best known for having a bit part in the cultural event of the late 1990s, the "Seinfeld" finale. She plays an on-scene reporter holding a conversation with Rivera regarding the "Seinfeld Four," making a reference to another of the rumors regarding the ending of Seinfeld. Wells says, "There's no love lost with that group. There seems to be some friction between Jerry Seinfeld and Elaine Benes. The rumor is that they once dated and that it ended badly." Rivera responds, "Maybe this trial will end up bringing them closer together. Maybe they'll end up getting married." Wells continues to receive residual checks for that role on Seinfeld to this day.

Wells has a bachelor's degrees in broadcast journalism and philosophy. She graduated with honors from the University of Southern California. After college, she married and had two children with her husband where they currently live in Los Angeles, California.

Awards
Wells has received honors, including a 1992 Peabody Award and a DuPont Award for live coverage of the Rodney King trial. She earned a Los Angeles Emmy Award for her investigative reporting in 1992, as well. She has received UPI, Press Club and Emmy Awards for feature reporting. Wells has received three Florida Emmy Awards for news reporting. For team reporting, she received the Investigative Reporters and Editors Award.

References

External links
Jane Wells bio - CNBC.com
Jane Wells blog - Funny Business

1961 births
American television journalists
People from Los Angeles County, California
Living people
University of Southern California alumni
American women television journalists
CNBC people
Peabody Award winners
USC Annenberg School for Communication and Journalism alumni
Journalists from California
21st-century American women